Ronald "Ronnie" Duane (born 31 May 1963), also known by the nickname of "Rhino", is an English former professional rugby league footballer who played in the 1980s and 1990s.

Background
Ronnie Duane's birth was registered in Newton, St. Helens, Lancashire, England.

Playing career

Warrington
Born in Warrington, Duane joined his hometown club from Woolston Rovers in April 1981. He made his debut for Warrington in October 1981 against Hull.

Duane played  in Warrington's 16–0 victory over St Helens in the 1982 Lancashire Cup Final during the 1982–83 season at Central Park, Wigan on Saturday 23 October 1982, and played as an substitute, replacing  Gary Sanderson, in the 24–16 victory over Oldham in the 1989 Lancashire Cup Final during the 1989–90 season at Knowsley Road, St. Helens on Saturday 14 October 1989, 

Duane played as a substitute, replacing  Steve Peters, in the 4–18 defeat by Wigan in the 1986–87 John Player Special Trophy Final during the 1986–87 season at Central Park, Wigan on Saturday 10 January 1987.

In 2011, Duane was inducted into Warrington's Hall of Fame.

Rochdale Hornets
Duane played and scored a try in Rochdale Hornets 14–24 defeat by St Helens in the 1991 Lancashire Cup Final during the 1991–92 season at Wilderspool Stadium, Warrington, on Sunday 20 October 1991.

International honours
Ronnie Duane won caps for Great Britain while at Warrington in 1983 against France (2 matches), and in 1984 against France, he played in Great Britain's 40-13 victory over Northern Territory during the 1984 Great Britain Lions tour at Darwin, Northern Territory, his tour lasted nine minutes before he was injured with torn knee-ligaments.

Personal life
Ronnie Duane is the younger brother of the rugby league  who played in the 1980s for Warrington, Rochdale Hornets and Springfield Borough; Ian Duane.

References

External links
(archived by web.archive.org) Statistics at orl-heritagetrust.org.uk
(archived by web.archive.org) Wolves Heritage 801 To 900
(archived by web.archive.org) Heritage Numbers 801 to 900
Team Talk: Remember this Warrington Wolves side?
(archived by web.archive.org) Statistics at wolvesplayers.thisiswarrington.co.uk

1963 births
Living people
English rugby league players
Great Britain national rugby league team players
Lancashire rugby league team players
Oldham R.L.F.C. players
Rochdale Hornets players
Rugby league centres
Rugby league players from St Helens, Merseyside
Rugby league second-rows
Swinton Lions players
Warrington Wolves players